Martin Jurow (December 14, 1911 - February 12, 2004) was a Hollywood agent, executive assistant and film producer.

After graduating from the College of William and Mary, he received his law degree from Harvard Law School in 1936 and joined a law firm in New York with show business clients. He moved to the William Morris Agency where he became head of their film department on the East coast.

After leaving William Morris he paired up with another agent, Richard Shepherd to produce films. Their first picture together was The Hanging Tree starring Gary Cooper and Maria Schell which they followed with The Fugitive Kind, an adaptation of Tennessee Williams's Orpheus Descending, starring Marlon Brando and Anna Magnani.

They signed a six picture deal with Paramount Pictures where they made films including an adaptation of Truman Capote's Breakfast at Tiffany's.

After Breakfast at Tiffany's he produced three more films without Shepherd involving Blake Edwards - Soldier in the Rain, The Pink Panther and The Great Race.

He moved to Texas and became Assistant District Attorney in Dallas. He later returned to film and co-produced Terms of Endearment which won the Academy Award for Best Picture.

Jurow wrote his memoirs in 2001.

Connected Family 
 Martin Jurow and his wife Erin-Jo Guinn are first cousins, by Erin-Jo, with model-actor Anne Gwynne, and first cousins once removed with Greg Gilford, her son; they were second cousins with actor Chris Pine, Anne Gwynne’s grandson. Martin and Erin-Jo were first cousins once removed with actor Robert Pine and Gwynne Gilford Pine.

Select Credits
He was a producer in all films unless otherwise noted.

Film

References

External links
Obituary at New York Times

Obituary at Los Angeles Times
Martin Jurow at TCMDB

1911 births
2004 deaths
Harvard Law School alumni
Talent agents
American film producers
College of William & Mary alumni